Tucky may refer to:

 Tucky Williams
 Tucky Buzzard
 Kentucky